ClickStar was a broadband movie distribution company founded by actor Morgan Freeman and film producer Lori McCreary of Revelations Entertainment. ClickStar launched on December 15, 2006 under the leadership of interim CEO James J. Ackerman and Chairman/Co-Founder Lori McCreary. The company is no longer in operation.

In 2006 ClickStar became the first company in motion picture history to offer a legitimate motion picture download, 10 Items or Less, while the film was still playing in theaters. ClickStar was highlighted by the American Film Institute in their AFI Awards 2006 "Moments of Significance" for this achievement.

References

External links
Intel Press Release
ExtendMedia Press Release
Washington Post

Defunct mass media companies of the United States
Film distributors of the United States
Companies based in Los Angeles County, California